Pompton may refer to the following in the U.S. state of New Jersey:

People
 Pompton people, an historical Native American tribe

Places
 Pompton Lakes, New Jersey, a borough in Passaic County
 Pompton Plains, New Jersey, a census-designated place in Pequannock Township
 Pompton Plains station
 Pompton River, a tributary of the Passaic River
 Pompton Township, New Jersey, which was divided in 1918 into three boroughs: Wanaque, Ringwood and Bloomingdale

See also 
 Pompton Mutiny, of Continental Army troops in 1781
 Prompton (disambiguation)